The Faculty of Engineering at Dalhousie University is a Canadian faculty of Dalhousie University located in Halifax, Nova Scotia.

The Faculty of Engineering was officially founded on 1 April 1997 with the merger of the Technical University of Nova Scotia (TUNS) into Dalhousie University.

The Faculty of Engineering traces its history to the School of Engineering at TUNS  and the Department of Engineering 2-year diploma program of the Faculty of Science at Dalhousie University.

The Faculty of Engineering includes the following departments:

 Civil and Resource Engineering
 Electrical & Computer Engineering
 Engineering Mathematics & Internetworking
 Industrial Engineering
 Mechanical Engineering
 Process Engineering & Applied Science
 Biomedical Engineering

External links 
 Faculty of Engineering website

Engineering
Dalhousie
1907 establishments in Nova Scotia
Educational institutions established in 1907